The Type 540 Gal-class submarine is a slightly modified variant of the German HDW Type 206 submarine class (which includes the distinctive dome, or bulge, in the front of the boat), modified for Israeli requirements. The Gal class submarines were built to Israeli specifications as the Vickers Type 540 at the Vickers shipyards in Barrow-in-Furness in the UK rather than Germany for political reasons. "Gal" (גל - Hebrew for "wave") was the name of the son of Abraham (Ivan) Dror, 3rd commander of the squadron and head of the project.

The Gal class of submarines were the first Israeli Navy submarines built to Israeli Navy specifications. They supplanted previous generations of submarines employed from 1958 by the Israeli navy which were refurbished and upgraded boats of the British S class and T class; submarines whose hull designs dated back to the decade before World War II.

Since entering service in the late 1970s, these small but agile and sophisticated submarines were continuously upgraded with newer systems to maintain their technological edge. They were somewhat unusual in that all boats of the class were at one point equipped with six-tube retractable Blowpipe surface-to-air missile launchers controlled from inside the boat, though these were later removed. The Israeli newspaper Maariv reports that Gal-class submarines were active in the 1982 Lebanon War. During the war, a Gal-class submarine fired two torpedoes and sank a Lebanese refugee boat, killing 25 people on board. During 1983 torpedo tube launched Sub-Harpoon anti-ship missiles and associated fire control systems were added to all boats of the Gal class. NT 37E torpedoes were acquired to replace the older Mk 37 models in 1987–88. All extensively overhauled in 1994–95, including improved sensors and fire control system. 

In the late 1990s, the Gal submarines were replaced with the new, much larger s built by HDW in Germany. The Gal boats were decommissioned in the early 2000s. One was scrapped and two were sent to HDW in Germany in hopes of finding a foreign buyer. When none was found, in October 2007 Gal was shipped back to Haifa, Israel and is now on display in the Israeli Naval Museum. Some changes were made in the submarine to make it accessible to visitors, such as entrances cut into her port (left) side.

Ships 
The first ship commissioned was Gal in December 1976. It was damaged by grounding on her delivery voyage but was repaired. Gal is now on display at the Israeli Naval museum in Haifa.

The next two Gal-class submarines were named after their retired Israeli submarine predecessors of the retired British T class who themselves were named after two sea monsters mentioned in Isaiah 51:9:

"Awake, awake, put on strength, O arm of the Lord; awake as in the ancient days, In the generation of old! Art thou not it that hath cut Rahab (Rahav), and wounded the dragon? (in Hebrew, Tanin)"  These names will also be placed on two boats of the Dolphin class.

References

Sources
Conway's All the World's Fighting Ships 1947–1995
http://www.submarines.dotan.net/gal/
http://www.globalsecurity.org/military/world/israel/gal.htm
http://www.dolphin.org.il

Submarine classes
 
Ships built in Barrow-in-Furness
Submarines of Germany
Museum ships in Israel